The Dongguk Tonggam (Comprehensive Mirror of the eastern state) is a chronicle of the early history of Korea compiled by Seo Geo-jeong (1420–1488) and other scholars in the 15th century.  Originally commissioned by King Sejo in 1446, it was completed under the reign of Seongjong of Joseon, in 1485. The official Choe Bu was one of the scholars who helped compile and edit the work. The earlier works on which it may have been based have not survived.  The Dongguk Tonggam is the earliest extant record to list the names of the rulers of Gojoseon after Dangun.

Content 
Dongguk Tonggam uses an annal form. Dongguk Tonggam is organised into 382 passages, of which 178 were selected from existing documents. The rest was written by the authors. In particular, Choi Bu authored 118 of them. Dongguk Tonggam is a valuable source of historical information and descriptions from Tangun to the later years of the Joseon Dynasty.

Feature 
In this book, the historical positions of Gija-Chosun, Mahan, and Silla, their successors, are elevated, and the positions of Dangun Chosun, Goguryeo, Baekje, Balhae and Goryeo are relatively lowered.

The book was first compiled by King Sejo in his attempt to reconstruct Korean history by accepting romantic and mythical historical descriptions rather than being bound by Confucian causes. However, it was not completed due to the uncooperative efforts of the Yushin groups to protect Confucian causes. <Samguksajeolyo> is part of the <Dongguk Tonggam>, which was revised under the Confucian justification, and was still part of the romantic atmosphere during King Sejo's reign.

See also
List of books about Korea
History of Korea

References

External links
朝鮮群書大系. 続 第3輯

15th-century history books
Early Korean history
Joseon dynasty
1485 books
History books about Korea
Chinese-language literature of Korea